WLMR (1450 AM) is a radio station broadcasting a religious format. Licensed to Chattanooga, Tennessee, United States, the station serves the Chattanooga area. The station is currently owned by Wilkins Communications Network, Inc. and features programming from USA Radio Network. In the early 1980s, the station was automated and played country music from studios in a strip mall on Brainerd Rd. It was also Chattanooga's first talk radio station when it held the WZRA call sign. WZRA was the first home of Jeff Styles, and also featured well known personalities such as Kelly McCoy and Robert T. Nash.

History
In 1946, with a 250-watt radio transmitter on Rossville Boulevard, the station signed on at 6:55 a.m. on January 21 as WAGC, said to stand for "Winning a Greater Chattanooga".  A network affiliate of the Mutual Broadcasting System, it also carried local programming, including baseball games of the Chattanooga Lookouts.  It became WOGA in November 1959, and WMOC in October 1961.  After a brief stint as WZRA from September 1983 to August 1984, it became WMOC again until November 1994, when it became WLMR.

References

External links
 Official website

FCC History Cards for WLMR

LMR
LMR
1946 establishments in Tennessee
Radio stations established in 1946